Sunrise Bank Limited is a commercial bank in Nepal. The bank is an ‘A’ class commercial bank licensed by Nepal Rastra Bank and has branches all across the nation with its head office in Kathmandu which provides entire commercial banking services.

The bank's shares are publicly traded as an 'A' category company in the Nepal Stock Exchange. The bank currently has 139  branches, 71 branchless banking units, 12 extension counters and 156 ATM terminals.

Correspondent Network
The bank has been maintaining correspondent relationships with various international banks from various countries to facilitate trade, remittance, and other cross border services. Through these correspondents, the bank is able to provide services in any major currencies in the world.

Network

Corporate Office
 Gairidhara Kathmandu NEPAL

Branches (139) till 4TH Mar 2021

 MAIN BRANCH (GAIRIDHARA KATHMANDU NEPAL)
 DHARAN BRANCH
 BESISAHAR BRANCH
 DAMAULI BRANCH
 TINKUNE BRANCH
 GABAHAL BRANCH
 KALIMATI BRANCH
 DHANGADHI BRANCH
 NEW ROAD BRANCH
 BIRTAMOD BRANCH
 ILAM BRANCH
 KAKARVITTA BRANCH
 CHABAHIL BRANCH
 MAHARAJGUNJ BRANCH
 PHARPING BRANCH
 NARAYANGHAT BRANCH
 BHAKTAPUR BRANCH
 BIRGUNJ BRANCH
 SUNWAL BRANCH
 BARDIBAS BRANCH
 PUTALISADAK  BRANCH
 BUDHANILKANTHA BRANCH
 RAJBIRAJ BRANCH
 DADELDHURA BRANCH
 BIRATNAGAR BRANCH
 SUNDAR BAZAR BRANCH
 BOUDHA BRANCH
 UDAYPUR BRANCH
 JHUMKA BRANCH
 SHANKHAMUL BRANCH
 GOTHATAR BRANCH
 GAUSALA BRANCH
 LAGANKHEL BRANCH
 POKHARA BRANCH
 TAUKHEL BRANCH
 LUVU BRANCH
 SURUNGA BRANCH
 BHADRAPUR BRANCH
 DUHABI BRANCH
 BIRATCHOWK BRANCH
 BHAINSEPATI BRANCH
 BANIYATAR BRANCH
 JYATHA BRANCH
 KALANKI BRANCH
 GAUR BRANCH
 SUKHAD BRANCH
 MAHENDRANAGAR BRANCH
 BHAIRAHAWA BRANCH
 NEPALGUNJ BRANCH
 DUMRE BRANCH
 BUTWAL BRANCH
 LAHAN BRANCH
 GAIGHAT BRANCH
 NEWROAD 2 BRANCH
 HETAUDA BRANCH
 BHARATPUR BRANCH
 ITAHARI BRANCH 
 TANDI BRANCH 
 KHUSHIBU BRANCH
 SITAPAILA BRANCH
 ATTARKHEL BRANCH
 DAMAK BRANCH
 TERATHUM BRANCH 
 BIRENDRANAGAR BRANCH
 DARCHULA BRANCH 
 PANAUTI BRANCH
 GONGABU BRANCH
 KAMALPOKHARI BRANCH 
 BUDHABARE BRANCH
 KALIKASTHAN BRANCH
 DEURALI BRANCH
 SANEPA BRANCH
 NARAINAPUR-TEAM
 BINDABASINI-TEAM
 MAIWAKHOLA -TEAM
 SANIBHERI-TEAM
 GUTHICHAUR BRANCH
 DURGABHAGWATI BRANCH
 AURAHI BRANCH
 BAMTIBHANDAR BRANCH
 CHURE BRANCH
 MARMA BRANCH
 GOTIKHEL BRANCH
 JANAKPUR BRANCH
 CHANDRANIGAHAPUR BRANCH
 NISDI BRANCH
 MOLUNG BRANCH
 SIDDHICHARAN BRANCH
 DHANKUTA BRANCH
 DHURKOT BRANCH
 TULSIPUR BRANCH
 MAHABHARAT BRANCH
 BARAHAPOKHARI BRANCH
 MIRCHAIYA BRANCH
 PRITI BRANCH
 CHAINPUR BRANCH
 JUMLA BRANCH
 LAMKI BRANCH
 TIKAPUR BRANCH
 MANAMAIJU BRANCH
 KOHALPUR BRANCH
 WALING BRANCH
 BAGAR BRANCH
 THECHO BRANCH
 RAM MANDIR LINE BRANCH
 KINJA BRANCH
 GATTHAGHAR BRANCH 
 MULPANI BRANCH
 SHIWALAYA BRANCH
 ATTARIYA BRANCH
 MANIGRAM BRANCH
 KAWASOTI BRANCH
 KALYANPUR BRANCH
 SIMARA BRANCH
 NIJGADH BRANCH
 NAIKAP BRANCH
 KUPONDOLE BRANCH
 TAMGHAS BRANCH
 KUSHMA BRANCH
 POKHARA BRANCH
 BANESHWOR BRANCH
 MANTHALI BRANCH
 BUDHI BAZAR BRANCH
 INARUWA BRANCH
 KHANAR BRANCH
 PARASIMA BRANCH
 TIMURE BRANCH
 BATTAR BRANCH
 PHUNGLING BRANCH
 DODHARA CHADANI BRANCH

TOLL-FREE 16600122444

External links
 Official Website of Sunrise Bank Limited
 Official Website of Nepal Rastra Bank

See also

 list of banks in Nepal
 Commercial Banks of Nepal

References

Banks of Nepal
2007 establishments in Nepal